Raining Rock is the second studio album from Jettblack, released through Spinefarm Records.

Reception
Music Enthusiast Magazine wrote, "Whether it’s the party rocking “Something About This Girl”, the standout ballad “Black Gold”, or the fast paced “Temptation”, the entire album completely dominates".

Track listing

 "Intro" - 1:09
 "Raining Rock" - 3:43
 "Less Torque, More Thrust" - 3:41
 "Prison Of Love" - 4:05
 "System" - 3:59
 "Black Gold" - 7:10
 "Something About This Girl" - 3:43
 "Sunshine" - 3:19
 "Temptation" - 3:53
 "Never Gonna Give It Up" - 3:17
 "Inbetween Lovers" - 3:57
 "Side Of The Road" - 3:31
 "The Sweet And The Brave" - 5:32
 "Raining Rock" (feat. Udo Dirkschneider) - "3:42" [Bonus Track]

Personnel
 Will Stapleton - vocals & guitars
 Jon Dow - vocals & guitars
 Tom Wright - bass
 Matt Oliver - drums

Additional musicians:
 Udo Dirkschneider - co-vocals on #14

References

2012 albums
Jettblack albums